Amrita Gogoi is an Indian film and television actress who works in Assamese film industry. She made her debut Ahetuk was released in 2015.

Filmography

Films

Music videos
 Pedel Mari Mari- Babu Borah
 Biju Biju Mon - Dikshu Sarma
 Malobika Borua - Dikshu Sarma

Theatres
Amrita Gogoi started her acting career of Mobile Theatre in the season of 2016 - 17 in Hengul Theatre where Prosenjit Bora and Syamontika Sharma in opposite role.

Awards and nominations

References

External links 
 

Actresses from Assam
Actresses in Assamese cinema
21st-century Indian actresses
Indian film actresses
Living people
Year of birth missing (living people)